Menage all'italiana, also known as Menage Italian Style, is a 1965 Italian comedy film about a bigamist who cannot resist getting married again and again. He has eight wives.

Cast
 Ugo Tognazzi: Alfredo
 Anna Moffo: Giovanna
 Maria Grazia Buccella: Egle
 Dalida: Armida
 Romina Power: Stella
 Mavie Bardanzellu: Virginia
 Monica Silwes: Ulla 
 Susanna Clemm: Erika 
 Rosalia Maggio: mother of Stella
 Paola Borboni 
  Dino

External links
 

1965 films
1960s Italian-language films
Commedia all'italiana
Films scored by Ennio Morricone
Films directed by Franco Indovina
1965 comedy films
1960s Italian films